Emmanuel Ikechukwu Nwachi (born October 10, 1988 in Durbi) is a Nigerian football forward.

Career 
He began his career with Plateau United before  transferred to Kano Pillars in 2005. He left Kano after two years and moved in January 2007 to Sharks F.C. On 13 October 2008, he left Sharks and moved to Bayelsa United F.C., helping them to a league title and securing a semi-final slot in the 2009 CAF Confederation Cup with the winning goal in the final group stage game at Stade Malien. Nwachi played on 16 January 2009 a training match for Start Kristiansand against Bryne FK. He joined Dolphins in September 2010.

Notes

1988 births
Living people
Dolphin F.C. (Nigeria) players
Igbo sportspeople
Sharks F.C. players
Nigerian footballers
Bayelsa United F.C. players
Association football forwards
Plateau United F.C. players
Kano Pillars F.C. players
Expatriate footballers in Thailand
Nakhon Si United F.C. players